PangYa ("Bang!", known as PangYa Exhilarating Golf in Japan) was an online multiplayer casual golf simulation game designed by Korean development company Ntreev Soft and NCSoft.

From 2005 until March 2009, the game was known as Albatross18 in North America. On March 8, 2009, control of the game was passed from OGPlanet to SG Interactive (then Ntreev USA), which closed the game for a month for technical upgrades and re-released the game as PangYa a month later. In May 2014, SG Interactive transferred the publishing rights to MAYN Interactive and transferred the publishing rights to SmileGate Europe in late 2014. On December 12, 2016, PangYas servers in North America shut down, along with its website and forums. The Korean servers were closed on August 29, 2016, and the Japanese servers, operated by Gamepot, were closed on November 10, 2017. The Thai servers, operated by Ini3 Digital, remain open.

Gameplay
PangYas gameplay is designed similar to most other golf games. The power and accuracy of a shot are determined by a meter located at the bottom of the screen, using the "three-click method": one click to activate the meter's bar, one click to set power, and one click to set accuracy. Clicking is either done by moving the mouse pointer over the bar and clicking, or simply pressing the space bar.

Should the player hit the ball with perfect (or almost-perfect) accuracy, the shot is called a "PangYa". Missing a PangYa will result in a loss of power, and either a 'hook' (where the ball angles to the left from the intended trajectory) or a 'slice' (where the ball angles to the right from the intended trajectory).

The similarity of PangYa with other online golf games end here. The game's graphics are anime derived, with many of its features stemming from creative imagination, as opposed to realism. Golf clubs resembling household products or baseball bats are used by some characters, and courses such as Silvia Cannon and Wiz Wiz are set in fantasy realms. Additionally, physically impossible special shots can be performed.

Game Modes
PangYa has several game modes.
Versus Mode - In versus mode, players compete against each other turn by turn with two to four players for 3, 6, 9, or 18 holes. Winners are determined by score. In the case of a tie, pang is used to choose the winner.
 Stroke Play is one of the versus mode options where players compete by strokes and score.
Match Play, unlike stroke play, is determined by the winner of the hole. Players still have to get a lower score than their opponent on each hole to win the hole, but they must have the most wins to win the whole game. Match play is played with two teams: a red team and a blue team. Players can go up against another player, or play with a partner against another player and their partner. If anyone quits in the middle of a game, the whole game is finished.
Tournament Mode - A mode where 4 to 30 players compete in real time. There are no turns but there is a ranking system.
Regular Tournament mode: There is a ranking system that determines who is the best player of the round. There are also special awards of bonus pang for various accomplishments. Trophies are also earned in this mode.
Team Tournament needs 12 to 30 people to play. Like Match Play, there is a red team and a blue team. Both teams need to have an equal number of people in order to start. At the end of the game, each team's score is tallied up and used to determine the winner.
Guild Tourney is when a guild battles against another guild. Players need to join a guild to play. Its function is similar to Team Tournament.
Battle Mode - A special mode of PangYa that differs from the original concept.
Pang Battle is a special versus mode where players gamble with pang. Players receive other players' pang for winning a hole. If there is a draw on the hole, it will carry over to the next hole causing it to double or quadruple the amount of the total pang. In case the game is finished and there is still a draw, there will be an approach hole where players have to be the closest to the hole without chipping in at the fastest time.
Approach Mode is where 4 to 30 players compete to be the closest and fastest person to the hole without chipping in. In Season 3, players pay 100 pang to play one hole. All pang is stored to a pot, with the top three players splitting the winnings. At rare times, the amount may double or even triple. As of Season 4, entrance fees/gambling have been removed and now participants can play up to nine holes with missions in which they must work together to win items. No missions can appear a lot where its normal approach mode without the gambling unless there are more players playing this mode. Some missions are for genders playing the game, genders of the character, chipping-in, distances, etc. At the end of the game, players get prizes from the treasure chests collected.
Special Shuffle Course Mode - Each hole is from a different course. The last hole is a special, new course that will give a large reward to players.
PSq's/Lounges - PSq's, or Player Squares, are where players can socialize and sell consumable pang items and pang clothes in any specific hole and course in the game.
Practice - Allows players to play the tutorial, as well as Practice courses, and repeat any holes they want to.
Chip Mode - Lets players practice getting holes in one.

Exchange and Upgrade Systems
Tiki's Magic Ball - Tiki's Magic Ball is a recycling system where players can trade their unwanted clubs and equipment for Tiki points. Players can exchange Tiki points for items in Cadie's Cauldron or upgrade their power, control, spin or curve slots in Character Mastery.
Cadie's Cauldron - Cadie's Cauldron is an exchange shop where players can exchange items to create a more helpful item, as well as allow the player to exchange gatcha items for the same gatcha item just in a different color or style.
Lolo's Card Deck - Lolo's Card Deck is a card exchange shop where the player can combine 3 cards for a better or worse card.
Character Mastery - Character Mastery is an upgrade system that allows players to upgrade their power, control, accuracy, spin and curve with pang. Players may also upgrade available slots with Tiki points.
Club Workshop - Club workshop is a Club Upgrade system that allows players to upgrade their clubs for better stats.

Clubs
A player will start the game with the default golf club. As the player progresses, they are given the option to purchase new clubs, using either Pang or Cookies (Points in the North America server). Players can also get a free Lucky Air Knight club from the tutorial that works until they rank to Junior E. Club sets differ from each other in term of stats provided, available upgrade slots, level requirement, and appearance. Just like in real golf, PangYa club sets contain 4 basic type of clubs: woods, irons, wedges, and putters.

Currency
The currency of PangYa is Pang. Pang is normally earned by finishing a hole at par or better, pulling off powerful shots, and making difficult chip-ins. Pang can be used at the Shop to buy equipment or items. Pang can also be used to upgrade equipment such as golf clubs, or the characters themselves, boosting their stats.
A cookie system has also been established on most PangYa servers which allows people to buy equipment and items using real-world currency. Rage Points system (which is a system designed to allow their respective virtual credit systems to be used with multiple games) replaces the cookie system but is identical in usage.

Ranking
In PangYa, a ranking system is used. As players continue to compete in more games in tournament mode or match play, they will gain more experience points and move up in rank. Most new players, if not all, start off with the Rookie F ranking and work their way up. The current maximum achievable rank is Infinity Legend A. The only exception is the Game Masters, which have their own rank, GM. When displayed in the lobby, this the highest rank of all.

Special Shots
In PangYa, special shots are achieved by doing different combinations of keys. The standard "perfect shot" is performed by hitting a shot that lands in the white bar, causing a voice to cheer "Pangya!". Under certain conditions, players can hit shots such as the Power Topspin, Power Backspin, and Power Curve, aiding them in avoiding obstacles or chipping the ball into the hole. More complicated shots can be achieved such as the Super Pangya, which adds 10-20 yards to a shot (depending on how many power bars are spent on the shot), as well as the Cobra, Tomahawk and Spike, which change the trajectory of the shot considerably.

Known Servers
A list of PangYa servers.

Other versions

Super Swing Golf series

First unveiled at Nintendo's E3 press conference during a montage trailer, Super Swing Golf was announced for the Wii gaming system. The game was in joint development by Ntreev Soft and Tecmo, was released on December 2, 2006, by Tecmo in Japan, and was released on December 12 of the same year in the US. Super Swing Golf has been built from the ground up for the Wii but still shares similar attributes with the PC version of the game. The sequel to Super Swing Golf, Super Swing Golf: Season 2, has also been released, featuring new items as well as the Deep Inferno, Pink Wind, and Ice Spa courses from PangYa on PC as well as the Special Shot 'Spike'.

PangYa: Fantasy Golf
On June 23, 2009, Tomy (under license from SK Telecom) released Pangya: Fantasy Golf for the Sony PSP in North America.

PangYa M
On November 18, 2014, NCSOFT (with cooperation from Ntreev Soft) announced PangYa Mobile for iOS and Android. Development progress was not updated for several years, but on October 5, 2017, NCSOFT licensed PangYa Mobile to LINE in order to launch game services in Thailand, Taiwan, and Indonesia. Thailand was the first country that PangYa Mobile launched in, having a short open beta period before its wide release. The game is available in Thai, Korean, Japanese, and English.

On December 30, 2019, it was announced on the official Facebook page that PangYa Mobile would close on February 7, 2020. However, NCSOFT has launched Pangya M, a redevelopment version of PangYa Mobile on July 3, 2020. Planned to release as a cross-platform game between the mobile version and PC version in NCSoft Purple platform.

See also
GolfStar
Shot Online
Winning Putt
Birdie Crush

References

External links
 Pangya Thailand - Official Thai Server (Ini3 Digital).
 

Android (operating system) games
IOS games
Windows games
Video games developed in South Korea
Golf video games
Tomy games
Massively multiplayer online role-playing games
2004 video games
Inactive massively multiplayer online games
Products and services discontinued in 2016
Smilegate games
Asiasoft games
OGPlanet games
Gamepot games